Dogwood Alliance is an environmental nonprofit organization based in Asheville, North Carolina.  The group works to achieve broad-based support to end unsustainable forestry practices in the region.  They focus in the marketplace to move large paper producers and customers away from sourcing their paper from endangered forests and towards increasing the use of post-consumer recycled fiber and other environmentally-friendly alternatives.  They are also developing a campaign to monetize environmental resources called Carbon Canopy, and a campaign against the use of whole trees for biofuel energy (called woody biofuel) entitled Our Forests Aren't Fuel.

Recent campaign victories include actions against Staples, Office Depot, and Bowater and the group is working to encourage fast food chains to change their practices.

References

External links

Forest conservation organizations
Forestry in the United States
Environmental organizations based in North Carolina